Across the Atlantic is a 1928 lost American silent romantic drama produced and distributed by Warner Bros. Influenced by the "Lindy craze", generated by Charles Lindbergh's famous ocean crossing flight, Across the Atlantic was rushed into production.

Plot
Two brothers, Hugh (Monte Blue) and Dan Clayton (Robert Ober), love their father's secretary, Phyllis Jones (Edna Murphy). She chooses Hugh, and they marry before he goes to war as a pilot. Shot down in France, he loses his memory and becomes a drifter. Eight years later, Phyllis, resigned to her fate, promises to marry Dan after a visit to the place in France where Hugh was last seen.

Meanwhile, Hugh, back in America, is working for his father (Burr McIntosh) at the Clayton aircraft company. While he is test-flying an aircraft, his memory returns. He crashes and is taken to an asylum because of his insistence that he is John Clayton's son.

Hugh escapes the asylum, steals an experimental trans-Atlantic aircraft, and flies it to Paris to be reunited with his family.

Cast

 Monte Blue as Hugh Clayton
 Edna Murphy as Phyllis Jones
 Burr McIntosh as John Clayton
 Robert Ober as Dan Clayton
 Irene Rich as unknown role

Production
Aviation historian Michael Paris in From the Wright Brothers to Top Gun: Aviation, Nationalism, and Popular Cinema (1995) described the frenzy of trying to woo Lindbergh to do a film. Hollywood resorted to a spate of aviation-related features including Publicity Madness (1927), Flying Romeos (1928) and  A Hero for a Night, even the Walt Disney Studios' Plane Crazy (1928),  all comedy spoofs of the Lindbergh transatlantic flight.

Across the Atlantic was a silent film but Warner Bros. added the Vitaphone process with musical score and sound effects, but no dialogue.

Reception
H. Hugh Wynne in The Motion Picture Stunt Pilots and Hollywood's Classic Aviation Movies (1987) wrote "Lindbergh's flight influenced the story of 'Across the Atlantic'."

References

Notes

Citations

Bibliography

 Paris, Michael. From the Wright Brothers to Top Gun: Aviation, Nationalism, and Popular Cinema. Manchester, UK: Manchester University Press, 1995. .
 White Munden, Kenneth, ed. The American Film Institute Catalog of Motion Pictures Produced in the United States: Feature Films, 1921–1930. Berkeley, California: University of California Press, 1997. .
 Wynne, H. Hugh. The Motion Picture Stunt Pilots and Hollywood's Classic Aviation Movies. Missoula, Montana: Pictorial Histories Publishing Co., 1987. .

External links
 
 
 

1928 films
American aviation films
American romantic drama films
American silent feature films
American black-and-white films
Films directed by Howard Bretherton
Transitional sound films
Warner Bros. films
Lost American films
1928 lost films
Lost romantic drama films
1928 romantic drama films
1920s American films
Silent romantic drama films
Silent American drama films